Thomas Phifer (born 1953 in South Carolina) is an American architect based in New York City.

He is perhaps best known for his design of the Glenstone Museum expansion in Potomac, Maryland, the North Carolina Museum of Art in Raleigh, North Carolina, the Corning Museum of Glass Contemporary Art + Design expansion, and the Brochstein Pavilion at Rice University in Houston, Texas.

Phifer designed the new Museum of Modern Art in Warsaw, which is currently under construction and will be located on the northern side of Plac Defilad next to the Palace of Culture and Science. It is scheduled to open in 2023.

Around 2006, Phifer won New York City‘s City Lights Design Competition, which began replacing the city’s high-pressure sodium streetlights with new standard LED streetlights starting in 2011.

Biography 
Phifer was born in Columbia, South Carolina. He earned a Bachelor of Architecture degree in 1975 and a Master of Architecture degree in 1977, both from Clemson University. He also studied at the Daniel Center for Architecture and Urban Studies in Genoa, Italy in 1976.

Phifer held the Stevenson Chair at the University of Texas and taught at Cornell University and the University of Pennsylvania. He served as the Louis I. Kahn Visiting Professor of Architectural Design at the Yale School of Architecture. He taught the Feltman Seminar at Cooper Union in the Spring of 2022.

Phifer launched his firm Thomas Phifer and Partners in 1997 after a decade of working for Richard Meier.

Reception and awards

In 2022, Phifer was elected as a lifetime member to the American Academy of Arts and Letters. That year, his Hudson Valley House II won a Architecture Honor Award from the New York Chapter of the AIA.

In 2020, Phifer's expansion of Glenstone won a National Honor Award from the American Institute of Architects and the "Best in Competition" Award from the New York Chapter of the AIA.

In 2020, Phifer's Corning Museum of Glass expansion won a National Honor Award for Interior Architecture from the AIA. The project also won an Merit Award for Architecture from the New York Chapter of the AIA in 2016.

In 2013, Phifer was awarded the Architecture Award from the American Academy of Arts and Letters.

Phifer was also elected as an Academician for the National Academy of Design in 2012.

In 2011, Phifer received a Fellowship from the American Institute of Architects. The North Carolina Museum of Art, received a National Honor Award from the AIA in 2011. 

In 2010, the Raymond and Susan Brochstein Pavilion received a National Honor Award from the AIA and an Honor Award from the American Academy of Landscape Architecture.

In 2009, he received a Research and Development Award from Architect magazine for his international competition-winning design for New York City's City Lights light fixture.

Phifer's Salt Point House won an American Architecture Award from the Chicago Atheneum in 2008.

In 2004, Phifer was awarded the Medal of Honor from the New York Chapter of the American Institute of Architects (AIA). That year, he received National Honor Awards from the AIA for both Steelcase and Taghkanic House.

Phifer received the Rome Prize in Architecture from the American Academy in Rome in 1995, and was honored with a residency the following year at the Academy's campus.

The San Francisco Chronicle's architecture critic John King described Phifer as "a master of meticulous modernism who has won praise for gem-like private homes and such cultural facilities as [the 2015] addition to the Corning Museum of Glass", but criticized 222 Second Street (completed by Tishman Speyer in 2016) as "designed and built by New Yorkers" without taking the building's San Francisco surroundings into account.

Works

References 

1953 births
Living people
Architects from New York City
20th-century American architects
21st-century American architects
Clemson University alumni